Júlio Correia da Silva (1 December 1919 – 18 March 2010), known as Julinho, was a Portuguese footballer who played as a forward.

Over the course of 13 seasons, he amassed Primeira Liga totals of 166 games and 170 goals, mainly at Benfica, where he won six major titles.

Career
Born in Ramalde, Portugal, Julinho started his career at Boavista F.C., debuting for the first-team at only 15, and staying until 1940. After a short stint at Académico F.C., he caught the attention of S.L. Benfica who signed him in 1942, despite better offers from FC Porto.

At Benfica, he went on to be part of the club's offensive line that included Mário Rui, Espírito Santo, Rogério Pipi and Arsénio, who were dubbed Os Cinco Diabos Vermelhos (The Five Red Devils). Mainly a centre forward, but could also play as inside forward, he made his debut on 11 October 1942 against Atlético and in the following eight seasons scored over 150 league goals, to help the club win three league titles.

He took part in the 12–2 trashing of Porto, on 7 February 1943, when he bagged four goals,  as well, the 7–2 win against Sporting CP on 28 April 1946. He scored six in a 13–1 win against A.D. Sanjoanense on 27 April 1947, one of the highest wins ever in Primeira Liga history. Already in his thirties, he scored the winning goal against FC Girondins de Bordeaux at the Latin Cup final on 18 June 1950, and made his last appearance for Benfica on 8 March 1953 against Barreirense. With 205 goals scored in 200 matches, he remains as the seventh highest goalscorer in Benfica history.

International career
Julinho was capped only once for Portugal, in a 2–0 loss against Spain on 21 March 1948 in Madrid.

Career statistics

Club

Honours

Club
Benfica
Primeira Liga: 1942–43, 1944–45, 1949–50
Taça de Portugal: 1942–43, 1943–44
Latin Cup: 1950

Individual
Primeira Liga: Top Scorer 1942–43, 1949–50
Taça de Portugal: Top Scorer 1943–44

References
General
 

Specific

External links
 

1919 births
2010 deaths
Footballers from Porto
Portuguese footballers
Association football forwards
Primeira Liga players
Portugal international footballers
Boavista F.C. players
S.L. Benfica footballers